Trini Elana Ross (born 1966) is an American lawyer serving as the United States attorney for the Western District of New York.

Early life and education 
Ross was born and raised in Buffalo, New York. She earned a Bachelor of Arts degree from the State University of New York at Fredonia in 1988, a Master of Arts from Rutgers University in 1990, and a Juris Doctor from the University at Buffalo Law School in 1992.

Career 

Ross began her career as an appellate attorney for the New York Supreme Court. She was an associate at Hiscock & Barclay, LLC before joining the Office of Professional Responsibility as assistant counsel. From 1995 to 2018, Ross served as an assistant United States attorney for the Western District of New York. She has also been an adjunct professor of law at Buffalo Law School. She has also served as director of the investigations for the National Science Foundation Office of Inspector General since 2018.

United States attorney 

On July 26, 2021, President Joe Biden nominated Ross to be the United States attorney for the Western District of New York. On September 23, 2021, her nomination was reported out of committee. On September 30, 2021, her nomination was confirmed in the United States Senate by voice vote. She was sworn into office on October 11, 2021.

References 

1966 births
Living people
20th-century American women lawyers
20th-century American lawyers
21st-century American women lawyers
21st-century American lawyers
Assistant United States Attorneys
New York (state) lawyers
Lawyers from Buffalo, New York
Rutgers University alumni
State University of New York at Fredonia alumni
United States Attorneys for the Western District of New York
United States National Science Foundation officials
University at Buffalo Law School alumni
University at Buffalo faculty